Sharlin Farzana is a Bangladeshi model and actress. She was born in Dhaka, Bangladesh.

Personal life 
Sharlin has one younger brother. She married Ehsanul Haque on 23 November 2019. She is a mother of a boy who was born in November 2020.

Early life 
Sharlin Farzana was born on 3 January 1992. She completed her SSC and HSC from Viqarunnisa Noon School and College. She took lessons in classical dancing from Bulbul Lalitakala Academy and also won a certificate for her Katthak performance. She was also enlisted as child artiste in Bangladesh television. At 5th grade in school She stood second in national primary scholarship examinations competing with the students from all across Dhaka. After graduating from Viqarunnisa Noon school she joined the same college.

Sharlin admitted In Shikder Medical College, Dhaka, as her parents always wanted her to be a doctor. But she was passionate about studying law. She studied Bar at law through an external program conducted by the University of London.

Career 
In the year 2008 she participated in 'Pantene you got the look' beauty contest. She won the award for 'best look' at the competition. She acted in a movie called Jaago where she played the character of a young journalist named Rukhsana in 2010. Grameenphone and Seylon Tea TVC were her early days works. She acted mainly TV Dramas like -  Waada, Too Love You More, The Miser, Bindutei Fera, Hotath Tomar Jonno, Come From Vua Pur, Life and Fiona, Poddopata, Bhalobashar Fanush, J Tumi Horon Koro, Tomar Amar Biye, Tukro Premer Badhon, Megh Bristir Alapon, Meghnil, Bindutei Fera, Too Late Bachelor etc. Sharlin Farzana is Brand Ambassador Drapes, Pantene Pro-V (Present). Sharlin Farzana also acted in a short film 'Saathiya'. She took part in Tariq Anam Khan's Natok theatre group called Nattokendro. Unoponchash Batash  is the latest film of Sharlin which is directed by the popular television director, playwright, and musician Masud Hasan Ujjal, The film is produced by Asif Hanif, under Red October's banner.

Works

Television drama

Drama series

Telefilms

Short films 
 Saathiya

Films

TVC 
Seylon Tea (2013)

Grameen Phone Clear Cut TVC (2014)

Senora TVC। Husband's Care (2018)

Web series

References 

Living people
People from Dhaka
21st-century Bangladeshi actresses
Bangladeshi female models
University of London
Bangladeshi television actresses
Year of birth missing (living people)